Merlin is a masculine given name. Notable people with the name include:

Male 
Merlin (rapper), British rapper
Merlin Bartz (born 1961), American politician
Merlin Bronques, American musician and photographer
Merlin Cadogan (born 1974), English escapologist
Merlin Carpenter (born 1967), English visual artist
Merlin Crossley, Australian molecular biologist, university teacher and administrator
Merlin A. Ditmer (1886-1950), American basketball coach
Merlin Donald (born 1939), Canadian psychologist
Merlin Guilfoyle (1908–1981), American Roman Catholic bishop
Merlin Hanbury-Tracy, 7th Baron Sudeley (1939–2022), British peer, author and right-wing activist
Merlin Holland (born 1946), English biographer
Merlin Hull (1871-1953), American lawyer
Merlin Hulse (born 1923), American politician
Merlin James (born 1960), Scottish artist
Merlin Kopp (1892-1960), American baseball athlete
Merlin R. Lybbert (1926-2001), Canadian general authority
Merlin Malinowski (born 1958), retired Canadian National Hockey League player
Merlin Mann (born 1966), American writer
Merlin Miller (born 1956), American film director
Merlin Minshall (1906–1987), British naval officer
Merlin Nippert (born 1938), American professional baseball player
Merlin Nunn (1930-2020), Canadian judge
Merlin Olsen (1940–2010), American football player
Merlin O'Neill (1898-1981), American commissioned officer
Merlin Owen Pasco (1892-1918), New Zealand entomologist
Merlin J. Peterson (1901-1977), American member of the Wisconsin State Assembly
Merlin Santana (1976–2002), American actor
Merlin F. Schneider (1901-1970), American officer
Merlin Bingham Swire (born 1973), British businessman
Merlin Tandjigora (born 1990), Gabonese footballer
Merlin Little Thunder (born 1956), American artist 
Merlin Tuttle (born 1941), American ecologist
Merlin Volzke (1925-2013), retired American jockey
Merlin Wiley (1875-1963), American politician
Merlin Wittrock (1931-2007), American educational psychologist

Female 
Merlin Diamond (born 1991), Namibian sprinter
Merlin D'Souza (born 1961), Indian composer
Merlin Stone (1931-2011), American author

Masculine given names
English masculine given names